Domenico Parodi (1672 – 19 December 1742, in Genoa) was an Italian painter, as well as a sculptor and architect, of the late-Baroque. He was the son of the famous Genoese sculptor Filippo Parodi and the older brother of the Baroque painter Giovanni Battista Parodi (1674-1730)

Biography
Domenico was initially apprenticed with in Venice Sebastiano Bombelli, then, in the early 1690s, working in the studios of Carlo Maratta and then under Maratta's pupil Paolo Girolamo Piola. Among his pupils were Nicolo Malatto, Angiolo Rossi, Batista Parodi (his brother); and son Domenico. Domenico Junior resided in Lisbon, and was a celebrated portrait painter in his day. Another pupil, briefly, was Francesco Campora. He frescoed a hall in Palazzo Negroni.

References

 S. Soldani: ‘Profilo di Domenico Parodi’, Crit. A., lxxxvii (1967), pp. 60–70
 F. Franchini Guelfi: ‘Domenico Parodi’, La scultura a Genova e in Liguria dal seicento al novecento (Campomorone, 1988), ii, pp. 280–1
 

17th-century Italian painters
Italian male painters
18th-century Italian painters
Italian Baroque painters
1672 births
1742 deaths
Painters from Genoa
18th-century Italian male artists